Amginsky District (Amma uluuha) is an administrative and municipal district (raion, or ulus), one of the thirty-four in the Sakha Republic, Russia. It is located in the southeast of the republic and borders with Churapchinsky District in the north, Ust-Maysky District in the east and southeast, Aldansky District in the south and southwest, and with Khangalassky and Megino-Kangalassky Districts in the northwest. Its administrative center is the rural locality (a selo) of Amga. As of the 2010 Census, the total population of the district was 17,183, with the population of Amga accounting for 38.0% of that number.

Geography
Amginsky is on flat terrain of the Prilenskoye Plateau (Lena Plateau).  The main river in the district is the Amga, which flows from southwest to northwest through the middle of district. The Amga enters the Aldan River about 140 km northeast of Amginsky District, which in turn flows west to the Lena River. The Tatta and the Suola River also flow through the district.   Amginsky District is about 100 km southeast of Yakutsk on the Lena.

Climate

History
The district was established on January 9, 1930.

Administrative and municipal status
Within the framework of administrative divisions, Amginsky District is one of the thirty-four in the republic. The district is divided into fourteen rural okrugs (naslegs) which comprise twenty-one rural localities. As a municipal division, the district is incorporated as Amginsky Municipal District. Its fourteen rural okrugs are incorporated into fourteen rural settlements within the municipal district. The selo of Amga serves as the administrative center of both the administrative and municipal district.

Inhabited localities

Economy
Because of the flat terrain and relatively mild summer climate, Amginsky District supports agriculture, primarily livestock, potatoes, fodder crops and timber.  There are also deposits of construction  materials.

Demographics
As of the 2002 Census, the ethnic composition was as follows:
Yakuts: 90.8%
Russians: 5.4%
Evenks: 1.5%
Evens: 0.8%
Ukrainians: 0.2%
others: 1.4%

References

Notes

Sources
Official website of the Sakha Republic. Registry of the Administrative-Territorial Divisions of the Sakha Republic. Amginsky District. 

Districts of the Sakha Republic